Robert Clifton Sarratt (1859–1926) was an American farmer, educator and politician. He served as a member of the South Carolina House of Representatives and the South Carolina Senate, representing Cherokee County, South Carolina.

Early life
Robert Clifton Sarrat was born on October 21, 1859. His father was James Madison Sarratt and his mother, Julia Ann Lipscomb. He had twelve siblings. His paternal family was of Welsh descent. Sarratt Creek was named after his great-grandfather, John Sarratt, who settled in South Carolina prior to the American Revolutionary War.

Sarratt graduated from Limestone College and Wofford College.

Career
Sarratt inherited a farm near Providence, South Carolina. He farmed in the summer and taught school in Gaffney, South Carolina in the winter. He eventually became the city superintendent for all schools in Gaffney.

Sarratt served as a member of the South Carolina House of Representatives and the South Carolina Senate, representing Cherokee County, South Carolina.

Personal life and death
Sarratt married Frances Amos, the daughter of Confederate veteran and Inman cotton plantation owner Charles McAlwreath Amos and granddaughter of Charles Amos, the co-owner of the Cowpens Iron Works and a slaveholder in the antebellum era. Their wedding was held on July 6, 1887 in Spartanburg, South Carolina. They resided on a farm near the Pacolet River on West Frederick Street in Gaffney, South Carolina. They had two sons and two daughters. One of his sons, Charles Madison Sarratt, became a dean of students and later dean of alumni at Vanderbilt University, where the Sarratt Student Center is named in his honor.

Sarratt died on October 27, 1926. His funeral was conducted by a Baptist minister, and he was buried in the Oakland Cemetery in Gaffney, South Carolina.

References

1859 births
1926 deaths
American people of Welsh descent
People from Gaffney, South Carolina
Limestone University alumni
Wofford College alumni
American farmers
Schoolteachers from South Carolina
Members of the South Carolina House of Representatives
South Carolina state senators
People from Orangeburg County, South Carolina